The Whangamata Beach Hop  is an event held in the town of Whangamatā, on the southeast coast of the Coromandel Peninsula in the North Island of New Zealand.

The first Beach Hop Whangamata Event was held in April 2001 and was established to coincide with the local Rock and Roll Club's birthday hop, which was bringing people to the town. A group of people established a one-day festival, and it is estimated that around 6,000 people attended, including many from out of town. NZ$3000 was raised from this event, which was donated to the Onemana and Whangamata Surf Life Saving Clubs, as well as the Whangamata Volunteer Coastguard.

The 2002 Beach Hop Festival put Whangamatā on the map for its rock and roll clubs, bands, hot rods, classic cars and motorcycles. It is estimated that over 10,000 people attended the festival, making it one of the largest events in the Coromandel area. Entrants were received from overseas, and from as far away as Wellington and Kaitaia. The event was featured in a number of national publications, and over $20,000 was raised for water safety organisations in the area.

Beach Hop 2003 was held 25–27 April 2003, with a police estimate of 25,000 people in attendance. There were a number of celebrities at the Beach Hop, including New Zealand fashion designer Trelise Cooper, and once again Gary McCormack travelled all the way up from Christchurch to be the festival MC. Nearly $30,000 was donated to the water safety benefactors. The event became the largest on the Coromandel Peninsula (by double), the largest speciality car show in New Zealand and the 2nd largest Rock’n’Roll festival in the Southern Hemisphere.

Beach Hop 2010 had a police estimate of 60,000 people in attendance.

In 2017 Repco Beach Hop won the New Zealand Event Association Award for New Zealand's Favourite Event with more than 120,000 people attending.

Festival statistics

References

External links
 Whangamata Beach Hop website
 Pictures from Whangamata Beach Hop 2002–2006
  Whangamata Surf Lifesaving Club

Music festivals in New Zealand
Recurring events established in 2001
Thames-Coromandel District
2001 establishments in New Zealand